Maria Baghramian (born 21 March 1954) is an Irish philosopher who is the Professor of American Philosophy in the School of Philosophy, University College Dublin (UCD). She was elected a member of the Royal Irish Academy (RIA) in 2010 and a member of the RIA Council from 2015 to 2018. Baghramian has published ten authored and edited books as well as articles and book chapters on topics in epistemology and twentieth century  American Philosophy. She was the Chief Editor of the International Journal of Philosophical Studies (IJPS) from 2003 to 2013.

Education and career
Baghramian graduated from Queen's University Belfast in Philosophy and Social Anthropology (1983) with a Double First. She received a PhD from Trinity College Dublin (TCD) in Philosophy of Logic under the supervision of Timothy Williamson (1990). Baghramian has taught in TCD and since 1990 in UCD. 
Baghramian was the Head of the School of Philosophy (2011–2013, 2017–2019) and a co-director of the Post Graduate Programme in Cognitive Science at University College Dublin, UCD (since 2000).
She is the founder of the Society for Women in Philosophy (SWIP) – Ireland (2010) and was the president for two terms. She was a Fulbright Scholar in 2013–14 and been  a visiting fellow in Harvard, MIT, and Institut Jean Nicod, École normale supérieure, in Paris. She has also been a frequent visiting lecturer in China, where she was adviser to China Association of Philosophy of Language  and in Armenia,  where she also contributes to the Yerevan Academy of Linguistics and Philosophy. In 2018, Baghramian was elected to the Executive of the International Federation of Philosophical Societies. and in the 2019 to the Programme Committee of the 2023 World Congress of Philosophy to be held in Melbourne.

Philosophy
Baghramian's publications focus on topics from contemporary epistemology, including relativism and the problem of intractable disagreements, to topics on trust and expertise. She also publishes on contemporary American Philosophy, particularly on Quine, Putnam, Davidson and Rorty.

Research projects
Baghramian was the principal investigator of a research project on the American Voice in Philosophy with funding from the Irish Research Council and the Society for the Advancement of American Philosophy. 
In 2015, she was awarded an Irish Research Council New Horizons funding for the interdisciplinary project on peer expert disagreement 'When Experts Disagree' (WEXD), where her co-investigator was the astrophysicist Luke Drury. Through her membership of the Royal Irish Academy, Baghramian has been an active participant of a  British Academy/ALLEA working group on Truth, Trust and Expertise. Three working papers by the groups were published in 2018 and 2019. She was also a member of a SAPEA advisory group, responsible for a report to the European Commission's Science Advisory Mechanism on Making Sense of Science Under Conditions of Uncertainty and Complexity published in 2019.
In July 2019, Baghramian was awarded three million euro grant by the European Commission for a research project on "the role of science in policy decision making and the conditions under which people should trust and rely on expert opinion that shapes public policy."  The project Policy, Expertise and Trust in Action (PEriTiA) runs from 2020 to 2023 and has partners from universities and academies in the UK, France, the Netherlands, Germany, Poland, Italy and Armenia.

Personal life
Maria Baghramian was born in Tehran, Iran, in an Armenian family but moved to Ireland in 1979 where she has continued to live with her husband, the composer and ethnomusicologist Hormoz Farhat. Their son, Robert Farhat is a Talent Developer and Programme Manager with the London Jazz Festival.

Selected publications 
 Relativism: New Problems of Philosophy. With A. Coliva. (2019) Routledge.
 The Virtues of Relativism. Proceedings of the Aristotelean Society. Supplementary Volumes, XCIII.
 From Trust to Trustworthiness, (Ed.) (2019). Routledge.
 Special Issues on Expertise and Expert Knowledge: Social Philosophy. With Martini, C. (2018, 2019). Taylor and Francis Volume 32, Issue 6. Volume 33, Issue 2.
 Divergent Perspectives on Expert Disagreement: Preliminary Evidence from Climate Science, Climate Policy, Astrophysics, and Public Opinion, Environmental Communication. With Luke Drury, James R Beebe, Finnur Delsén. (2018). DOI:10.1080/17524032.2018.1504099.
 Special Issue on Trust. (2018). International Journal of Philosophical Studies 26(2):135-138.
 Pragmatism and the European traditions: Encounters  with analytical philosophy and phenomenology before the Great Divide. With S. Marchetti (Eds.) (2017). Routledge.
 Philosophy in the Twentieth Century: The Mingled Story of Three Revolutions. With S. Marchetti. (2-17). Pragmatism and the European Traditions. 10–30. Routledge.
 Comments on Annalisa Coliva, Extended Rationality: A Hinge Epistemology. (2017). International Journal for the Study of Skepticism 2017(7):1-9.
 Quine, Naturalised Meaning and Empathy. (2016). Augmenta, 2(1):25-41.
 Hilary Putnam and Relativism. (2015). in James D. Wright (Ed). Encyclopedia of Social and Behavioral Sciences. Wiley.
 Richard Rorty. (2015). With F. McHugh. In James D. Wright (Ed). Encyclopedia of Social and Behavioral Sciences. Wiley.
 Relativism. (2015) with A. Carter. Stanford Encyclopedia of Philosophy.
 Contemporary Pragamtism. (2014–2019) (Eds). with John Shook. Volume 10–14. Brill.
 The Depths and Shallows of Style in Philosophy. (2014)/ Journal of Philosophical Research, 39:311-323.
 The Many Faces of Relativism. (Ed.)(2014) London/New York: Taylor and Francis.
 Donald Davidson: Life and Words. (Ed.) (2013) London/New York: Routledge.
 Reading Putnam. (Ed.) (2012) London/New York: Routledge.
 Relativism: The Problems of Philosophy Series. (2004) London/New York: Routledge. 
 Pluralism: The Philosophy and Politics of Diversity. With Atracta Ingram. (Ed.) (2000) London/New York: Routledge. Translated into Chinese
 Modern Philosophy of Language. (1999) London: J.M. Dent 1998 and Washington: Counterpoint 1999.

References 

Living people
Members of the Royal Irish Academy
Irish women philosophers
Iranian women philosophers
20th-century Irish philosophers
21st-century Irish philosophers
Philosophers of language
Philosophers of logic
Women logicians
Analytic philosophers
Alumni of Trinity College Dublin
Alumni of Queen's University Belfast
Academics of Trinity College Dublin
Academics of University College Dublin
1954 births
Writers from Tehran
Iranian emigrants to Ireland
Iranian people of Armenian descent
Irish people of Armenian descent
Armenian philosophers